Franky De Gendt (born 27 June 1952) is a Belgian former professional racing cyclist. He rode in two editions of the Tour de France.

References

External links

1952 births
Living people
Belgian male cyclists
People from Temse
Cyclists from East Flanders